Naif Al-Harthi (born December 19, 1983), is a Saudi Arabian professional footballer who plays for Afif as a defender .

References

1983 births
Living people
Al-Taawoun FC players
Wej SC players
Al-Nahda Club (Saudi Arabia) players
Abha Club players
Afif FC players
Saudi Arabian footballers
Saudi First Division League players
Saudi Professional League players
Saudi Second Division players
Saudi Fourth Division players
Association football defenders